The following lists events that happened during 1974 in Afghanistan.

Throughout the year Afghanistan continues to suffer from the effects of the shortage of rainfall that afflicted the northern and central areas during the preceding three years. Many of the affected areas are remote and difficult to reach, lying beyond the main lines of communication and the few good highways laid down by Soviet and U.S. engineers as part of the massive aid programs of their respective countries. Daud Khan and his cabinet in Kabul do their best to mount rescue operations with the help of aid from abroad, but in areas where the subsistence level remains low, even in the best of times, deaths from starvation can not be prevented. Inevitably, discontent over the failure of the new republican regime to cope with economic difficulties manifests itself in a number of areas. In the capital itself, the euphoria that followed the abolition of the monarchy in 1973 and the attendant hopes for the dawn of a more democratic era begin to falter and fade in the face of the president's masterful rule. Many who expected an improvement in their position, including members of the armed services and the central bureaucracy, find themselves disappointed. Nevertheless, the president's personal authority over the central government is never effectively challenged. He commands the loyalty of the bulk of the armed forces, and their efficiency, thanks to Soviet help in both training and the supply of sophisticated weaponry, is high. The central government is strong enough to enforce its will upon outlying areas should the occasion arise.

Incumbents
 President: Mohammed Daoud Khan

Beginning of June 1974
President Daud pays a three-day official visit to Moscow, during which he signs an extensive economic cooperation agreement with the Soviet Union. The close ties with the Soviet Union are not allowed to imperil Afghanistan's cherished and traditional neutrality, however. During the year Daud also concludes a cooperation agreement with China and forms a new link with Bangladesh, to which he promises assistance. Only with Pakistan are his relations difficult; he continues to support schemes for the creation of an independent Pakhtunistan and a new "Greater Baluchistan" that, if realized, would give Afghanistan a corridor through friendly territory to the coast of the Arabian Sea. His representatives raise these questions at numerous international gatherings, including the Islamic summit held at Lahore, Pakistan, early in the year, but they receive little or no encouragement. However, this in no way diminishes Daud's determination to persist with his plans.

Autumn 1974
It is announced that another attempt to overthrow the regime has been discovered and quashed; its leader has been executed and 11 participants imprisoned. Shortly afterward there is trouble in Tahar province, where the Muslim Brotherhood, which dislikes President Daud's secularizing policy, is very influential. The government is obliged to take stern action; 70 members of the brotherhood are arrested, along with the governor of the province, the Revenue Commissioner, and the Superintendent of Police, and all are brought to trial on charges of plotting against the state.

 
Afghanistan
Years of the 20th century in Afghanistan
Afghanistan
1970s in Afghanistan